Centrum Island (in Danish: Centrum Ø) is a small island in North Greenland, south East of the John Murray Island, and West of J.P. Koch Fjord. The island is described as 'inconspicuous and fladt'.

The island is approximately 52408 m2 (5.2408 ha) in size based on measurements on topographical maps. 

The island was visited and named by the Second Thule Expedition on July 2. - 3. 1917. The name was chosen because the island would be the center of cartographical investigations being performed. On July 3 1917 the expedition left behind things, which were found in 1978 by the Danish Sirius Dog Sled Patrol and again in 1985.  

Thorild Wulff collected lichens, vascular plants and bryophytes on the Island.

References 

Uninhabited islands of Greenland
Islands of Greenland